"Sayonara Baby" (Sayonaraベイベー) is Miliyah Kato's thirteenth single, released on September 24, 2008. On its first day the song debuted at #10. The song's second A-side, "Koi Shiteru" (恋シテル; I'm in Love), samples the song "I Love Your Smile". "Sayonara Baby" has been certified Platinum for Chaku Uta Full downloads of over 250,000.

Track listing 

2008 singles
Miliyah Kato songs